Saim Sadiq is a Pakistani screenwriter and director who won the Jury Prize of the Un Certain Regard section at the 2022 Cannes Film Festival for directing the drama film Joyland, the first Pakistani film to be selected in Cannes. Joyland also won the Queer Palm award during its world premiere at Cannes.

Biography 
Sadiq grew up in what he describes as a "middle-class, conservative family" in Rawalpindi. He attended St Mary's Academy in Lalazar, Rawalpindi. He graduated with a BSc with honors in anthropology from the Lahore University of Management Sciences in 2014. He obtained his MFA in Screenwriting and Directing from the Columbia University School of the Arts in 2019.

His first short, Nice Talking To You, was an official selection at SXSW 2019, Palm Springs 2019, and was a BAFTA Shortlist for Best Student Film. He also won Vimeo’s Best Director award at Columbia University Film Festival along with the Kodak Gold Award.

For his Columbia film school thesis, he explored the world of trans dancers in the short Darling, which won the Orizzonti Award for Best Short Film in the 76th Venice International Film Festival. It was also the first Pakistani film to screen and win an award at the Venice Film Festival and received special jury mention at SXSW and was an official selection at the 2019 Toronto International Film Festival before being acquired by Focus Features.

Sadiq said that his filmmaking has been inspired by his upbringing and discovery of a transgender community in Lahore that is only a 10-minute ride from his childhood home.

References 

Living people
Columbia University School of the Arts alumni
Pakistani directors
People from Lahore
Lahore University of Management Sciences alumni
Year of birth missing (living people)